Marwar Junction railway station (station code MJ) is located in Pali district in the Indian state of Rajasthan. It serves the census town  at Marwar Junction.

The railway station

History
Rajputana State Railway extended the Delhi–Ajmer -wide metre-gauge line to Ahmeabad in 1881. It was converted to  broad gauge in 1997.

The Rajputana–Malwa Railway built the metre-gauge line from Marwar Junction to Pali in 1882. Later, this section was extended to Jodhpur and formed the Jodhpur Railway. The line now runs up to Munabao on the India–Pakistan border and has been fully converted to broad gauge.

The Mavli–Marwar metre-gauge line was opened in 1936.

Cultural references

In fiction 
The station is mentioned in Chapter 1 of Rudyard Kipling's short story "The Man Who Would Be King" which was first published in The Phantom Rickshaw and other Eerie Tales (1888).  It is the meeting place of the narrator, Kipling in all but name, and Daniel Dravot.

References

External links
  Trains at Marwar Junction

Railway stations in Pali district
Ajmer railway division
1881 establishments in British India
Railway stations in India opened in 1881